Maxwell's equations, or Maxwell–Heaviside equations, are a set of coupled partial differential equations that, together with the Lorentz force law, form the foundation of classical electromagnetism, classical optics, and electric circuits. 
The equations provide a mathematical model for electric, optical, and radio technologies, such as power generation, electric motors, wireless communication, lenses, radar etc. They describe how electric and magnetic fields are generated by charges, currents, and changes of the fields. The equations are named after the physicist and mathematician James Clerk Maxwell, who, in 1861 and 1862, published an early form of the equations that included the Lorentz force law. Maxwell first used the equations to propose that light is an electromagnetic phenomenon. The modern form of the equations in their most common formulation is credited to Oliver Heaviside.

Maxwell's equations may be combined to demonstrate how fluctuations in electromagnetic fields (waves) propagate at a constant speed in vacuum, c. Known as electromagnetic radiation, these waves occur at various wavelengths to produce a spectrum of radiation from radio waves to gamma rays.

The equations have two major variants. The microscopic equations have universal applicability but are unwieldy for common calculations. They relate the electric and magnetic fields to total charge and total current, including the complicated charges and currents in materials at the atomic scale. The macroscopic equations define two new auxiliary fields that describe the large-scale behaviour of matter without having to consider atomic-scale charges and quantum phenomena like spins. However, their use requires experimentally determined parameters for a phenomenological description of the electromagnetic response of materials.
The term "Maxwell's equations" is often also used for equivalent alternative formulations. Versions of Maxwell's equations based on the electric and magnetic scalar potentials are preferred for explicitly solving the equations as a boundary value problem, analytical mechanics, or for use in quantum mechanics. The covariant formulation (on spacetime rather than space and time separately) makes the compatibility of Maxwell's equations with special relativity manifest. Maxwell's equations in curved spacetime, commonly used in high-energy and gravitational physics, are compatible with general relativity. In fact, Albert Einstein developed special and general relativity to accommodate the invariant speed of light, a consequence of  Maxwell's equations, with the principle that only relative movement has physical consequences.

The publication of the equations marked the unification of a theory for previously separately described phenomena: magnetism, electricity, light, and associated radiation.
Since the mid-20th century, it has been understood that Maxwell's equations do not give an exact description of electromagnetic phenomena, but are instead a classical limit of the more precise theory of quantum electrodynamics.

History of the equations

Conceptual descriptions

Gauss's law

Gauss's law describes the relationship between a static electric field and electric charges: a static electric field points away from positive charges and towards negative charges, and the net outflow of the electric field through a closed surface is proportional to the enclosed charge, including bound charge due to polarization of material. The coefficient of the proportion is the permittivity of free space.

Gauss's law for magnetism

Gauss's law for magnetism states that electric charges have no magnetic analogues, called magnetic monopoles; no north or south magnetic poles exist in isolation. Instead, the magnetic field of a material is attributed to a dipole, and the net outflow of the magnetic field through a closed surface is zero. Magnetic dipoles may be represented as loops of current or inseparable pairs of equal and opposite "magnetic charges". Precisely, the total magnetic flux through a Gaussian surface is zero, and the magnetic field is a solenoidal vector field.

Faraday's law

The Maxwell–Faraday version of Faraday's law of induction describes how a time-varying magnetic field corresponds to curl of an electric field. In integral form, it states that the work per unit charge required to move a charge around a closed loop equals the rate of change of the magnetic flux through the enclosed surface.

The electromagnetic induction is the operating principle behind many electric generators: for example, a rotating bar magnet creates a changing magnetic field and generates an electric field in a nearby wire.

Ampère's law with Maxwell's addition

The original law of Ampère states that magnetic fields relate to electric current. Maxwell's addition states that they also relate to changing electric fields, which Maxwell called displacement current. The integral form states that electric and displacement currents are associated with a proportional magnetic field along any enclosing curve.

Maxwell's addition to Ampère's law is important because the laws of Ampère and Gauss must otherwise be adjusted for static fields. As a consequence, it predicts that a rotating magnetic field occurs with a changing electric field. A further consequence is the existence of self-sustaining electromagnetic waves which travel through empty space.

The speed calculated for electromagnetic waves, which could be predicted from experiments on charges and currents, matches the speed of light; indeed, light is one form of electromagnetic radiation (as are X-rays, radio waves, and others). Maxwell understood the connection between electromagnetic waves and light in 1861, thereby unifying the theories of electromagnetism and optics.

Formulation in terms of electric and magnetic fields (microscopic or in vacuum version)

In the electric and magnetic field formulation there are four equations that determine the fields for given charge and current distribution. A separate law of nature, the Lorentz force law, describes how, conversely, the electric and magnetic fields act on charged particles and currents. A version of this law was included in the original equations by Maxwell but, by convention, is included no longer. The vector calculus formalism below, the work of Oliver Heaviside, has become standard. It is manifestly rotation invariant, and therefore mathematically much more transparent than Maxwell's original 20 equations in x,y,z components. The relativistic formulations are even more symmetric and manifestly Lorentz invariant. For the same equations expressed using tensor calculus or differential forms, see .

The differential and integral formulations are mathematically equivalent; both are useful. The integral formulation relates fields within a region of space to fields on the boundary and can often be used to simplify and directly calculate fields from symmetric distributions of charges and currents. On the other hand, the differential equations are purely local and are a more natural starting point for calculating the fields in more complicated (less symmetric) situations, for example using finite element analysis.

Key to the notation

Symbols in bold represent vector quantities, and symbols in italics represent scalar quantities, unless otherwise indicated.
The equations introduce the electric field, a vector field, and the magnetic field, a pseudovector field, each generally having a time and location dependence.
The sources are
the total electric charge density (total charge per unit volume), and
the total electric current density (total current per unit area), .

The universal constants appearing in the equations (the first two ones explicitly only in the SI units formulation) are:
the permittivity of free space, and
the permeability of free space, and
the speed of light,

Differential equations
In the differential equations, 
the nabla symbol, denotes the three-dimensional gradient operator, del,
the  symbol (pronounced "del dot") denotes the divergence operator,
the  symbol (pronounced "del cross") denotes the curl operator.

Integral equations
In the integral equations, 
 is any volume with closed boundary surface , and
 is any surface with closed boundary curve ,
The equations are a little easier to interpret with time-independent surfaces and volumes. Time-independent surfaces and volumes are "fixed" and do not change over a given time interval. For example, since the surface is time-independent, we can bring the differentiation under the integral sign in Faraday's law:

Maxwell's equations can be formulated with possibly time-dependent surfaces and volumes by using the differential version and using Gauss and Stokes formula appropriately. 
 is a surface integral over the boundary surface , with the loop indicating the surface is closed
 is a volume integral over the volume ,
 is a line integral around the boundary curve , with the loop indicating the curve is closed.
 is a surface integral over the surface ,
 The net electric current  is the surface integral of the electric current density  passing through a fixed surface, :  where  denotes the differential vector element of surface area , normal to surface .

Formulation in SI units convention

Formulation in Gaussian units convention

With a corresponding change in convention for the Lorentz force law this yields the same physics, i.e. trajectories of charged particles, or work done by an electric motor. These definitions are often preferred in theoretical and high energy physics where it is natural to take the electric and magnetic field with the same units, to simplify the appearance of the electromagnetic tensor: the Lorentz covariant object unifying electric and magnetic field would then contain components with uniform unit and dimension. Such modified definitions are conventionally used with the Gaussian (CGS) units. Using these definitions and conventions, colloquially "in Gaussian units",
the Maxwell equations become:

The equations simplify slightly when a system of quantities is chosen in the speed of light, c, is used for nondimensionalization, so that, for example, seconds and lightseconds are interchangeable, and c = 1.

Relationship between differential and integral formulations

The equivalence of the differential and integral formulations are a consequence of the Gauss divergence theorem and the Kelvin–Stokes theorem.

Flux and divergence

According to the (purely mathematical) Gauss divergence theorem, the electric flux through the 
boundary surface  can be rewritten as

The integral version of Gauss's equation can thus be rewritten as 

Since  is arbitrary (e.g. an arbitrary small ball with arbitrary center), this is satisfied if and only if the integrand is zero everywhere. This is 
the differential equations formulation of Gauss equation up to a trivial rearrangement.

Similarly rewriting the magnetic flux in Gauss's law for magnetism in integral form gives  

which is satisfied for all  if and only if  everywhere.

Circulation and curl

By the Kelvin–Stokes theorem we can rewrite the line integrals of the fields around the closed boundary curve  to an integral of the "circulation of the fields" (i.e. their curls) over a surface it bounds, i.e.

Hence the modified Ampere law in integral form can be rewritten as 

Since  can be chosen arbitrarily, e.g. as an arbitrary small, arbitrary oriented, and arbitrary centered disk, we conclude that the integrand is zero if and only if Ampere's modified law in differential equations form is satisfied.
The equivalence of Faraday's law in differential and integral form follows likewise.

The line integrals and curls are analogous to quantities in classical fluid dynamics: the circulation of a fluid is the line integral of the fluid's flow velocity field around a closed loop, and the vorticity of the fluid is the curl of the velocity field.

Charge conservation
The invariance of charge can be derived as a corollary of Maxwell's equations. The left-hand side of the modified Ampere's law has zero divergence by the div–curl identity. Expanding the divergence of the right-hand side, interchanging derivatives, and applying Gauss's law gives:

i.e.,

By the Gauss divergence theorem, this means the rate of change of charge in a fixed volume equals the net current flowing through the boundary:

In particular, in an isolated system the total charge is conserved.

Vacuum equations, electromagnetic waves and speed of light

In a region with no charges and no currents, such as in a vacuum, Maxwell's equations reduce to:

Taking the curl  of the curl equations, and using the curl of the curl identity we obtain

The quantity  has the dimension of (time/length)2. Defining
, the equations above have the form of the standard wave equations

This led him to propose that light and radio waves were propagating electromagnetic waves, since amply confirmed. In the new SI system, only c keeps its defined value, and the electron charge gets a defined value.

In materials with relative permittivity, and relative permeability, the phase velocity of light becomes

A sinusoidal plane wave is one special solution of these equations. Maxwell's equations explain how these waves can physically propagate through space. The changing magnetic field creates a changing electric field through Faraday's law. In turn, that electric field creates a changing magnetic field through Maxwell's addition to Ampère's law. This perpetual cycle allows these waves, now known as electromagnetic radiation, to move through space at velocity .

Macroscopic formulation
The above equations are the microscopic version of Maxwell's equations, expressing the electric and the magnetic fields in terms of the (possibly atomic-level) charges and currents present. This is sometimes called the "general" form, but the macroscopic version below is equally general, the difference being one of bookkeeping.

The microscopic version is sometimes called "Maxwell's equations in a vacuum": this refers to the fact that the material medium is not built into the structure of the equations, but appears only in the charge and current terms. The microscopic version was introduced by Lorentz, who tried to use it to derive the macroscopic properties of bulk matter from its microscopic constituents.

"Maxwell's macroscopic equations", also known as Maxwell's equations in matter, are more similar to those that Maxwell introduced himself.

In the macroscopic equations, the influence of bound charge  and bound current  is incorporated into the displacement field  and the magnetizing field , while the equations depend only on the free charges  and free currents . This reflects a splitting of the total electric charge Q and current I (and their densities  and J) into free and bound parts:

The cost of this splitting is that the additional fields  and  need to be determined through phenomenological constituent equations relating these fields to the electric field  and the magnetic field , together with the bound charge and current.

See below for a detailed description of the differences between the microscopic equations, dealing with total charge and current including material contributions, useful in air/vacuum;
and the macroscopic equations, dealing with free charge and current, practical to use within materials.

Bound charge and current

When an electric field is applied to a dielectric material its molecules respond by forming microscopic electric dipoles – their atomic nuclei move a tiny distance in the direction of the field, while their electrons move a tiny distance in the opposite direction. This produces a macroscopic bound charge in the material even though all of the charges involved are bound to individual molecules. For example, if every molecule responds the same, similar to that shown in the figure, these tiny movements of charge combine to produce a layer of positive bound charge on one side of the material and a layer of negative charge on the other side. The bound charge is most conveniently described in terms of the polarization  of the material, its dipole moment per unit volume. If  is uniform, a macroscopic separation of charge is produced only at the surfaces where  enters and leaves the material. For non-uniform , a charge is also produced in the bulk.

Somewhat similarly, in all materials the constituent atoms exhibit magnetic moments that are intrinsically linked to the angular momentum of the components of the atoms, most notably their electrons. The connection to angular momentum suggests the picture of an assembly of microscopic current loops. Outside the material, an assembly of such microscopic current loops is not different from a macroscopic current circulating around the material's surface, despite the fact that no individual charge is traveling a large distance. These bound currents can be described using the magnetization .

As such, Maxwell's macroscopic equations ignore many details on a fine scale that can be unimportant to understanding matters on a gross scale by calculating fields that are averaged over some suitable volume.

Auxiliary fields, polarization and magnetization
The definitions of the auxiliary fields are:

The macroscopic bound charge density  and bound current density  in terms of polarization  and magnetization  are then defined as

If we define the total, bound, and free charge and current density by

Constitutive relations

In order to apply 'Maxwell's macroscopic equations', it is necessary to specify the relations between displacement field  and the electric field , as well as the magnetizing field  and the magnetic field . Equivalently, we have to specify the dependence of the polarization  (hence the bound charge) and the magnetization  (hence the bound current) on the applied electric and magnetic field. The equations specifying this response are called constitutive relations. For real-world materials, the constitutive relations are rarely simple, except approximately, and usually determined by experiment. See the main article on constitutive relations for a fuller description.

For materials without polarization and magnetization, the constitutive relations are (by definition)

where  is the permittivity of free space and  the permeability of free space. Since there is no bound charge, the total and the free charge and current are equal.

An alternative viewpoint on the microscopic equations is that they are the macroscopic equations together with the statement that vacuum behaves like a perfect linear "material" without additional polarization and magnetization.
More generally, for linear materials the constitutive relations are

where  is the permittivity and  the permeability of the material. For the displacement field  the linear approximation is usually excellent because for all but the most extreme electric fields or temperatures obtainable in the laboratory (high power pulsed lasers) the interatomic electric fields of materials of the order of 1011 V/m are much higher than the external field. For the magnetizing field , however, the linear approximation can break down in common materials like iron leading to phenomena like hysteresis. Even the linear case can have various complications, however.
Materials are generally dispersive, so  and  depend on the frequency of any incident EM waves.

E.g., the original equations given by Maxwell (see History of Maxwell's equations) included Ohm's law in the form

Alternative formulations

Following is a summary of some of the numerous other mathematical formalisms to write the microscopic Maxwell's equations, with the columns separating the two homogeneous Maxwell equations from the two inhomogeneous ones involving charge and current. Each formulation has versions directly in terms of the electric and magnetic fields, and indirectly in terms of the electrical potential  and the vector potential . Potentials were introduced as a convenient way to solve the homogeneous equations, but it was thought that all observable physics was contained in the electric and magnetic fields (or relativistically, the Faraday tensor). The potentials play a central role in quantum mechanics, however, and act quantum mechanically with observable consequences even when the electric and magnetic fields vanish (Aharonov–Bohm effect).

Each table describes one formalism. See the main article for details of each formulation.  SI units are used throughout.

Relativistic formulations 

The Maxwell equations can also be formulated on a spacetime-like Minkowski space where space and time are treated on equal footing. The direct spacetime formulations make manifest that the Maxwell equations are relativistically invariant. Because of this symmetry, the electric and magnetic fields are treated on equal footing and are recognized as components of the Faraday tensor. This reduces the four Maxwell equations to two, which simplifies the equations, although we can no longer use the familiar vector formulation. In fact the Maxwell equations in the space + time formulation are not Galileo invariant and have Lorentz invariance as a hidden symmetry. This was a major source of inspiration for the development of relativity theory. Indeed,  even the formulation that treats space and time separately is not a non-relativistic approximation and describes the same physics by simply renaming variables. For this reason the relativistic invariant equations are usually called the Maxwell equations as well.

Each table below describes one formalism.

In the tensor calculus formulation, the electromagnetic tensor  is an antisymmetric covariant order 2 tensor; the four-potential, is a covariant vector; the current, is a vector; the square brackets, denote antisymmetrization of indices;  is the partial derivative with respect to the coordinate, . The topological restriction is that the second real cohomology group of the space vanishes (see the differential form formulation for an explanation). This is violated for Minkowski space with a line removed, which can model a (flat) spacetime with a point-like monopole on the complement of the line.
In the special case of 2-forms such as F, the Hodge star  depends on the metric tensor only for its local scale. This means that, as formulated, the differential form field equations are conformally invariant, but the Lorenz gauge condition breaks conformal invariance. The operator  is the d'Alembert–Laplace–Beltrami operator on 1-forms on an arbitrary Lorentzian spacetime. The topological condition is again that the second real cohomology group is 'trivial' (meaning that its form follows from a definition). By the isomorphism with the second de Rham cohomology this condition means that every closed 2-form is exact.

Other formalisms include the geometric algebra formulation and a matrix representation of Maxwell's equations. Historically, a quaternionic formulation was used.

Solutions
Maxwell's equations are partial differential equations that relate the electric and magnetic fields to each other and to the electric charges and currents. Often, the charges and currents are themselves dependent on the electric and magnetic fields via the Lorentz force equation and the constitutive relations. These all form a set of coupled partial differential equations which are often very difficult to solve: the solutions encompass all the diverse phenomena of classical electromagnetism. Some general remarks follow.

As for any differential equation, boundary conditions and initial conditions are necessary for a unique solution. For example, even with no charges and no currents anywhere in spacetime, there are the obvious solutions for which E and B are zero or constant, but there are also non-trivial solutions corresponding to electromagnetic waves. In some cases, Maxwell's equations are solved over the whole of space, and boundary conditions are given as asymptotic limits at infinity. In other cases, Maxwell's equations are solved in a finite region of space, with appropriate conditions on the boundary of that region, for example an artificial absorbing boundary representing the rest of the universe, or periodic boundary conditions, or walls that isolate a small region from the outside world (as with a waveguide or cavity resonator).

Jefimenko's equations (or the closely related Liénard–Wiechert potentials) are the explicit solution to Maxwell's equations for the electric and magnetic fields created by any given distribution of charges and currents. It assumes specific initial conditions to obtain the so-called "retarded solution", where the only fields present are the ones created by the charges. However, Jefimenko's equations are unhelpful in situations when the charges and currents are themselves affected by the fields they create.

Numerical methods for differential equations can be used to compute approximate solutions of Maxwell's equations when exact solutions are impossible. These include the finite element method and finite-difference time-domain method. For more details, see Computational electromagnetics.

Overdetermination of Maxwell's equations
(The currents and charges are not unknowns, being freely specifiable subject to charge conservation.) This is related to a certain limited kind of redundancy in Maxwell's equations: It can be proven that any system satisfying Faraday's law and Ampere's law automatically also satisfies the two Gauss's laws, as long as the system's initial condition does, and assuming conservation of charge and the nonexistence of magnetic monopoles. 
This explanation was first introduced by Julius Adams Stratton in 1941.

Although it is possible to simply ignore the two Gauss's laws in a numerical algorithm (apart from the initial conditions), the imperfect precision of the calculations can lead to ever-increasing violations of those laws. By introducing dummy variables characterizing these violations, the four equations become not overdetermined after all. The resulting formulation can lead to more accurate algorithms that take all four laws into account.

Both identities , which reduce eight equations to six independent ones, are the true reason of overdetermination.

Equivalently, the overdetermination can be viewed as implying conservation of electric and magnetic charge, as they are required in the derivation described above but implied by the two Gauss's laws.

For linear algebraic equations, one can make 'nice' rules to rewrite the equations and unknowns. The equations can be linearly dependent. But in differential equations, and especially PDEs, one needs appropriate boundary conditions, which depend in not so obvious ways on the equations. Even more, if one rewrites them in terms of vector and scalar potential, then the equations are underdetermined because of gauge fixing.

Maxwell's equations as the classical limit of QED
Maxwell's equations and the Lorentz force law (along with the rest of classical electromagnetism) are extraordinarily successful at explaining and predicting a variety of phenomena.  However they do not account for quantum effects and so their domain of applicability is limited. Maxwell's equations are thought of as the classical limit of quantum electrodynamics (QED).

Some observed electromagnetic phenomena are incompatible with Maxwell's equations. These include  photon–photon scattering and many other phenomena related to photons or virtual photons, "nonclassical light" and quantum entanglement of electromagnetic fields (see Quantum optics). E.g. quantum cryptography cannot be described by Maxwell theory, not even approximately. The approximate nature of Maxwell's equations becomes more and more apparent when going into the extremely strong field regime (see Euler–Heisenberg Lagrangian) or to extremely small distances.

Finally, Maxwell's equations cannot explain any phenomenon involving individual photons interacting with quantum matter, such as the photoelectric effect, Planck's law, the Duane–Hunt law, and single-photon light detectors. However, many such phenomena may be approximated using a halfway theory of quantum matter coupled to a classical electromagnetic field, either as external field or with the expected value of the charge current and density on the right hand side of Maxwell's equations.

Variations
Popular variations on the Maxwell equations as a classical theory of electromagnetic fields are relatively scarce because the standard equations have stood the test of time remarkably well.

Magnetic monopoles

Maxwell's equations posit that there is electric charge, but no magnetic charge (also called magnetic monopoles), in the universe. Indeed, magnetic charge has never been observed, despite extensive searches, and may not exist. If they did exist, both Gauss's law for magnetism and Faraday's law would need to be modified, and the resulting four equations would be fully symmetric under the interchange of electric and magnetic fields.

See also

Explanatory notes

References

Further reading

Historical publications
 On Faraday's Lines of Force – 1855/56. Maxwell's first paper (Part 1 & 2) – Compiled by Blaze Labs Research (PDF).
 On Physical Lines of Force – 1861. Maxwell's 1861 paper describing magnetic lines of force – Predecessor to 1873 Treatise.
 James Clerk Maxwell, "A Dynamical Theory of the Electromagnetic Field", Philosophical Transactions of the Royal Society of London 155, 459–512 (1865). (This article accompanied a December 8, 1864 presentation by Maxwell to the Royal Society.)
 A Dynamical Theory Of The Electromagnetic Field – 1865. Maxwell's 1865 paper describing his 20 equations, link from Google Books.
 J. Clerk Maxwell (1873), "A Treatise on Electricity and Magnetism":
 Maxwell, J. C., "A Treatise on Electricity And Magnetism" – Volume 1 – 1873 – Posner Memorial Collection – Carnegie Mellon University.
 Maxwell, J. C., "A Treatise on Electricity And Magnetism" – Volume 2 – 1873 – Posner Memorial Collection – Carnegie Mellon University.

The developments before relativity:

 
 
 
 Henri Poincaré (1900) "La théorie de Lorentz et le Principe de Réaction" , Archives Néerlandaises, V, 253–278.
 Henri Poincaré (1902) "La Science et l'Hypothèse" .
 Henri Poincaré (1905) "Sur la dynamique de l'électron" , Comptes Rendus de l'Académie des Sciences, 140, 1504–1508.
 Catt, Walton and Davidson. "The History of Displacement Current" . Wireless World, March 1979.

External links

 
 maxwells-equations.com — An intuitive tutorial of Maxwell's equations.
 The Feynman Lectures on Physics Vol. II Ch. 18: The Maxwell Equations
 Wikiversity Page on Maxwell's Equations

Modern treatments
 Electromagnetism (ch. 11), B. Crowell, Fullerton College
 Lecture series: Relativity and electromagnetism, R. Fitzpatrick, University of Texas at Austin
 Electromagnetic waves from Maxwell's equations on Project PHYSNET.
 MIT Video Lecture Series (36 × 50 minute lectures) (in .mp4 format) – Electricity and Magnetism Taught by Professor Walter Lewin.

Other

Nature Milestones: Photons – Milestone 2 (1861) Maxwell's equations

 
Electromagnetism
Equations of physics
Functions of space and time
James Clerk Maxwell
Partial differential equations
Scientific laws